In general relativity, the Komar superpotential, corresponding to the invariance of the Hilbert–Einstein Lagrangian , is the tensor density:

 

associated with a vector field , and where  denotes covariant derivative with respect to the Levi-Civita connection.

The Komar two-form:

 

where  denotes interior product, generalizes to an arbitrary vector field  the so-called above Komar superpotential, which was originally derived for timelike Killing vector fields.

Komar superpotential is affected by the anomalous factor problem: In fact, when computed, for example, on the Kerr–Newman solution, produces the correct angular momentum, but just one-half of the expected mass.

See also
Einstein–Hilbert action
Komar mass
Tensor calculus
Christoffel symbols
Riemann curvature tensor

Notes

References
 

Equations of physics
Tensors
General relativity